"Top of the World (Olé, Olé, Olé)" is a stand-alone single from Chumbawamba. It was released in June 1998, and the single reached number 21 on the UK Singles Chart. It was also featured on the World Cup 1998 compilation album Music of the World Cup: Allez! Ola! Ole!. Their 1997 album Tubthumper was re-issued with this song on the album.

Track listings

CD1
"Top of the World (Olé Olé Olé)"
"The Best Is Yet to Come (Acoustic Version)"
"The Best Is Yet to Come"
"I'm a Winner, Baby"
"Strike! (Barnsley 3 Man Utd. 2 Mix)"

CD2
"Top of the World"
"The Best Is Yet to Come (Acoustic Version)"
"The Best Is Yet to Come (Bee Hole End Version)"
"I’m a Winner Baby"

References

Chumbawamba songs
1998 singles
EMI Records singles
1998 songs